Bocana manifestalis is a moth of the family Erebidae. It was first described by Francis Walker in 1858. It is widespread from India through the Pacific.

Description
Its wingspan is about 36–40 mm. Males with third joint of palpi upturned and naked. No tuft from second joint. Antennae pectinated. Forewings with a large costal fold. Male with bipectinate antennae with moderate length branches. Body dark fuscous brown. Forewings with indistinct oblique antemedial dark line. A white or black speck found at end of cell. There is a waved postmedial line excurved beyond cell. An irregularly sinuous submarginal line present. Hindwings with medial and submarginal waved lines. Ventral side with black cell-spot. Many specimens have two waved line with whitish outer edges.

Larvae have been recorded on various grasses and weeds.

References

External links

Japanese Moths
Australian Faunal Directory

Herminiinae
Moths of Japan